{{DISPLAYTITLE:C27H44O}}
The molecular formula C27H44O (molar mass: 384.63 g/mol, exact mass: 384.339216 u) may refer to:

 Cholecalciferol
 7-Dehydrocholesterol
 Desmosterol
 Previtamin D3
 Zymosterol, a cholesterol intermediate